Molinaranea is a genus of South American orb-weaver spiders first described by Cândido Firmino de Mello-Leitão in 1940.

Species
 it contains seven species:
Molinaranea clymene (Nicolet, 1849) – Chile, Argentina
Molinaranea fernandez Levi, 2001 – Chile (Juan Fernandez Is.)
Molinaranea magellanica (Walckenaer, 1847) – Chile, Argentina, Juan Fernandez Is., Falkland Is.
Molinaranea mammifera (Tullgren, 1902) – Chile
Molinaranea phaethontis (Simon, 1896) – Chile, Argentina
Molinaranea surculorum (Simon, 1896) – Chile
Molinaranea vildav Levi, 2001 – Chile

References

Araneidae
Araneomorphae genera
Spiders of South America
Taxa named by Cândido Firmino de Mello-Leitão